Delphine Gleize (born 5 May 1973) is a French film director and screenwriter. She has directed ten films since 1998. Her film Carnages was screened in the Un Certain Regard section at the 2002 Cannes Film Festival.

Filmography
 Sale battars (1998)
 Un château en Espagne (1999)
 Le piranha andalou (1999)
 Le légume en question (2000)
 Les méduses (2000)
 Carnages (2002)
 L'homme qui rêvait d'un enfant (2006)
 Instants fragiles (2008)
 Cavaliers seuls (documentary, 2010)
 La permission de minuit (2011)

References

External links

1973 births
Living people
French film directors
French women screenwriters
French screenwriters
French women film directors
People from Saint-Quentin, Aisne